Cassinia cunninghamii, commonly known as Cunninghams everlasting, is a plant native to central New South Wales in eastern Australia.

Description
The leaf upper surface is dark green and rough with fine short hairs. The underside densely covered with long white matted hairs. The overlapping bracts are in longitudinal rows of 3 or 4, broadly rounded and translucent brown.

Taxonomy and naming
Cassinia cunninghamii was first formally described  in 1838 by Augustin Pyramus de Candolle and the description was published in Prodromus Systematis Naturalis Regni Vegetabilis. The specific epithet cunninghamii honours the botanical collector Allan Cunningham.

Distribution and habitat
Cunninghams everlasting grows on sandstone in dry sclerophyll forest mostly from the upper Hunter Region to Nowra and west to Newnes in New South Wales.

References

cunninghamii
Asterales of Australia
Flora of New South Wales
Plants described in 1838
Taxa named by Augustin Pyramus de Candolle